Quercus glabrescens is a species of oak. It is endemic to the mountains of east-central Mexico.

Description
It is placed in Quercus section Quercus.

Range and habitat
Quercus glabrescens is found in the southern Sierra Madre Oriental, eastern Trans-Mexican Volcanic Belt, and Sierra Madre de Oaxaca ranges, in the states of Mexico, Hidalgo, Puebla, Querétaro, Tlaxcala, Veracruz, and Oaxaca. Few  populations are found in the Sierra de Miahuatlán and Sierra Madre del Sur of southern and western Oaxaca.

Quercus glabrescens is found mainly in mountain cloud forests, and sometimes in cold, humid conifer forests, from 2,270 to 3,000 meters elevation. It is often a dominant species where it is found, and is associated with oyamel (Abies religiosa, Quercus affinis, Q. crassifolia, and Q. rugosa.

Conservation
Quercus glabrescens is locally abundant within its range. Despite some habitat loss from logging and clearing forests for pasture and farms, there no reports of decline, and the population trend is assumed to be relatively stable. The species' conservation status is Least Concern.

References

glabrescens
Endemic oaks of Mexico
Flora of the Sierra Madre Oriental
Flora of the Sierra Madre de Oaxaca
Flora of the Trans-Mexican Volcanic Belt
Flora of the Sierra Madre del Sur
Plants described in 1840
Cloud forest flora of Mexico